Discovery of the Year is an award handed out yearly at the World Soundtrack Awards to commemorate an excellent piece of musical work in the field of TV and movie soundtracks that seemed to come out of nowhere, hence the title of the award. It has been handed out since the World Soundtrack Awards' debut in 2001. The category sometimes has multiple nominees and sometimes does not.

2001 Moulin Rouge! and Kiss of the Dragon - Craig Armstrong
Beck - "Hämndens pris" - Adam Nordén
Ftina tsigara - Panayotis Kalantzopoulos
The Man Who Cried - Osvaldo Golijov
Pollock - Jeff Beal
Wo hu cang long - Tan Dun
2002 The Time Machine - Klaus Badelt
2003 Cidade de Deus - Antonio Pinto
2004 21 Grams - Gustavo Santaolalla
Chasing Liberty and Les Fils du vent - Christian Henson
Eternal Sunshine of the Spotless Mind - Jon Brion
Master and Commander: The Far Side of the World - Iva Davies, Christopher Gordon & Richard Tognetti
La Puta y la ballena - Daniel Tarrab & Andrés Goldstein
2005 The Incredibles - Michael Giacchino
Dear Wendy - Benjamin Wallfisch
Deuda - Andrés Goldstein & Daniel Tarrab
Layer Cake - Ilan Eshkeri
The Syrian Bride - Cyril Morin
2006 Babam Ve Oglum - Evanthia Reboutsika
Les Brigades du Tigre - Olivier Florio
Monster House - Douglas Pipes
The Proposition - Nick Cave & Warren Ellis
The Thief Lord - Nigel Clarke & Michael Csányi-Wills
2007 XXY & Inheritance - Daniel Tarrab & Andrés Goldstein
Harry Potter and the Order of the Phoenix - Nicholas Hooper
Mr. Brooks - Ramin Djawadi
The Science of Sleep - Jean Michel Bernard
La Tourneuse de Pages - Jerome Lemonnier
2008 American Gangster - Marc Streitenfeld
Aanrijding in Moscou - 
Before the Rains - Mark Kilian
The Escapist - Benjamin Wallfisch
El Orfanato - Velásquez Fernando
2009 The Reader - Nico Muhly
Babylon A.D. - Atli Örvarsson
Crying with Laughter - Lorne Balfe
Demain dès l'aube - Jérôme Lemonnier
Journey to the Center of the Earth - Andrew Lockington
2010 A Single Man - Abel Korzeniowski
Skin - Hélène Muddiman
The Book of Eli - Atticus Ross, Claudia Sarne, Leopold Ross
District 9 - Clinton Shorter
The Last Station - Sergey Yevtushenko
2011 The First Grader, The Rite - Alex Heffes
Limitless - Paul Leonard-Morgan
Natural Selection, Hamill - iZLER
Hanna - The Chemical Brothers (Ed Simons and Tom Rowlands)
X-Men: First Class and Gulliver's Travels - Henry Jackman
2012 Albert Nobbs - Brian Byrne
Immortals - Trevor Morris
Take Shelter - David Wingo
Lola Versus & Nobody Walks - Fall On Your Sword
The Raven, Sleep Tight, Cold Light of Day - Lucas Vidal
2013 Beasts of the Southern Wild - Dan Romer & Benh Zeitlin
Copperhead - Laurent Eyquem
Oblivion - Anthony Gonzalez & Joseph Trapanese
Hammer of the Gods & Summer in February - Benjamin Wallfisch
The Spectacular Now & The Way Way Back - Rob Simonsen
2014 Cuban Fury & The Counselor - Daniel Pemberton
Calvary - Patrick Cassidy
La Chair de Ma Chair & Zum Geburtstag - Jérôme Lemonnier 
Gravity & The World's End - Steven Price
The Young and Prodigious T.S. Spivet - Denis Sanacore
2015 Birdman - Antonio Sánchez
But Always & Highway of Love - Zhiyi Wang
Ex Machina - Ben Salisbury & Geoff Barrow (Portishead)
A Most Violent Year - Alex Ebert (Edward Sharpe and the Magnetic Zeros)
Spooks: The Greater Good - Dominic Lewis
2016 Mission: Impossible – Rogue Nation - Joe Kraemer
10 Cloverfield Lane & The Boy - Bear McCreary
The Big Short - Nicholas Britell
Eddie the Eagle - Matthew Margeson
Synchronicity - Ben Lovett
2017 Moonlight - Nicholas Britell
Get Out - Michael Abels
Lady Macbeth - Dan Jones
Lion - Hauschka & Dustin O'Halloran
My Cousin Rachel - Rael Jones
2018 Mudbound - Tamar-kali
Nostalgia - Laurent Eyquem
Sicario: Day of the Soldado - Hildur Guðnadóttir
Girl - Valentin Hadjadj
Mary Shelley - Amelia Warner
2019 Us - Michael Abels
The Last Tree - Segun Akinola
Green Book - Kris Bowers
Where Hands Touch - Anne Chmelewsky
Under the Silver Lake - Disasterpeace2020 The Two Popes - Bryce Dessner
Berlin Alexanderplatz - Dascha Dauenhauer
A Shaun the Sheep Movie: Farmageddon - Tom Howe
Uncut Gems - Daniel Lopatin
The Personal History of David Copperfield - Christopher Willis

References
World Soundtrack Awards on IMDb
WSA - Discovery of the Year 2007

World Soundtrack Awards